Here Comes Trouble is the first album by thrash metal band Scatterbrain, released in 1990.

The album spent 16 weeks on Billboard's album charts, peaking at #138.

It contains a cover version of Cheech and Chong's "Earache My Eye". The single "Don't Call Me Dude" makes reference to vaudeville routine "Slowly I Turned", and the intro is a parody of Dion's "Runaround Sue".

The follow-up single "Down With the Ship (Slight Return)" features snippets from a number of classic rock and heavy metal songs, as detailed below.

Critical reception
The album's initial reception was generally positive, with reviews noting the quality of the band's vocals and humorous approach to heavy metal. The album proved memorable enough for some music writers that it enjoyed continuing retrospective coverage into the 2000s. Later reviews reflect on the album's quirky and sometimes scattered themes, as well as the quality musicianship. Others believe the album demonstrates that the band should hold a more important place in the history of the genre, in spite of the fact that later offerings failed to reach the level of success enjoyed by Here Comes Trouble.

Track listing
"Here Comes Trouble" — 3:54
"Earache My Eye" — 2:47
"That's That" — 3:57
"I'm With Stupid" — 5:05
"Down With the Ship (Slight Return)" — 2:29
"Sonata #3" — 1:54
"Mr. Johnson And The Juice Crew" — 1:55
"Goodbye Freedom, Hello Mom" — 4:49
"Outta Time" — 3:36
"Don't Call Me Dude" — 5:14
"Drunken Milkman" — 1:19

Song Snippets in "Down With The Ship"
Voodoo Child (Slight Return) - Jimi Hendrix
Rock and Roll - Led Zeppelin
Dazed and Confused - Led Zeppelin
Seek And Destroy - Metallica
La Grange (drum fill) - ZZ Top
Lonely Is the Night - Billy Squier
The Ocean - Led Zeppelin
Walk This Way - Aerosmith
Heartbreaker- Led Zeppelin
In the Air Tonight (drum fill) - Phil Collins
Roundabout - Yes
Roadhouse Blues - The Doors
Ain't Talkin' 'bout Love - Van Halen
Where Eagles Dare (drum intro) - Iron Maiden
The Star-Spangled Banner
The Woody Woodpecker Song

Charts

References

External links
Here Comes Trouble at Discogs

1990 albums
Scatterbrain (band) albums
Relativity Records albums
Funk metal albums